Norwira Zazmie (born 26 February 1990) is a Malaysian cricketer. He was part of Malaysia's squad for the 2008 Under-19 Cricket World Cup. In September 2019, he was named in Malaysia's squad for the 2019 Malaysia Cricket World Cup Challenge League A tournament. He made his List A debut for Malaysia, against Denmark, in the Cricket World Cup Challenge League A tournament on 16 September 2019.

References

External links
 

1990 births
Living people
Malaysian cricketers
Southeast Asian Games gold medalists for Malaysia
Southeast Asian Games medalists in cricket
Competitors at the 2017 Southeast Asian Games